Lytwyn is a surname. A spelling variant of the Ukrainian surname Lytvyn, it denoted residents of the Grand Duchy of Lithuania, a multi-ethnic historical state in northeastern Europe.

Other forms include Litvin and Litwin. Lytwyn may refer to:

 Charlie Lytwyn (born 1964), Scottish footballer
 Kevin Lytwyn (born 1991), Canadian gymnast
 Ken Lytwyn (born 1965), Marine mammalogist

See also
 

Ukrainian-language surnames